Huang Wenhu (22 July 1926 – 19 May 2022) was a Chinese engineer and university administrator who served as president of Harbin Institute of Technology from 1983 to 1985. He was an academician of the Chinese Academy of Engineering.

Biography
Huang was born in Shanghai, on 22 July 1926, while his ancestral home in Yongkang, Zhejiang. He was the elder of six children. His parents named him "Wenhu" due to his Chinese zodiac belonged to the "tiger". He was brought up by his grandparents in Zhoushan of Yongkang. In 1945, he entered Zhejiang University, where he majored in electrical engineering. He also received his master's degree from Harbin Institute of Technology.

After graduating in May 1949, Huang worked in the Hangzhou Military Control Commission Finance Department and than the Tianjin Central Electrician No. 2 Factory. He joined the Chinese Communist Party (CCP) in May 1995. Starting in 1950, he was made a deputy director. He moved up the ranks to become director of Academic Committee of Harbin University of Technology in January 1981 and president in May 1981. He was dean of the Graduate School of Harbin Institute of Technology in September 1984 and subsequently director of the Vibration Engineering Research Center of Harbin University of Technology in January 1989.

On 19 May 2022, Huang died from an illness in Harbin, Heilongjiang, at the age of 96.

Honours and awards
 1995 Member of the Chinese Academy of Engineering (CAE)

References

1926 births
2022 deaths
Engineers from Shanghai
Zhejiang University alumni
Harbin Institute of Technology alumni
Academic staff of Harbin Institute of Technology
Members of the Chinese Academy of Engineering